Fixxations is the debut EP by Norwegian band Serena Maneesh, released in 2002 on CD by HoneyMilk Records and on 12" vinyl by Hype City Recordings.

Track listing
 Drive Me Home the Lonely Nights  – 3:16
 Blues Like Beehive  – 3:23
 Ballad of Jeze Ballet  – 5:25
 Hear Bleed Philharmonic  – 2:52
 Oxygene, Please! (bonus track on 12" vinyl edition)

Production 
The EP was recorded at Spendless during February–March 2002.

The songs were composed by Emil Nikolaisen, Lina Holmström and Håvard Krogedal. "Blues Like Beehive" was re-recorded as "Beehiver II" for the band's full-length debut album Serena Maneesh (2005).

Personnel 

 Lina Holmström: bass, organ, vocals
 Håvard Krogedal: organ, bass
 Emil Nikolaisen: guitar, vocals
 Marko Hautakoski: drums
 Marcus Forsgren: guitar
 Eivind Schou: violin, "space sounds"
 Harald Frøland: guitar (track 3)
 Sondre Tristan Midttun: guitar (track 1)
 Arve Paulsen: flute (tracks 3 and 4)
 Ole Johannes Åleskjær: backing vocals (track 1)
 Thor Eivind Nordgarden: vocals (track 3)
 Johnny Skalleberg: mix
 Christian Engfelt: mix

External links
SerenaManeesh.com Official band website
Serena Maneesh@HoneyMilk Artist page (domestic label)

2003 debut EPs
Serena-Maneesh albums